Cappawhite, also Cappaghwhite, is a village in County Tipperary, Ireland and is located on the R505 regional road from Cashel to County Limerick. Close major towns near the village include Tipperary Town which is 12 kilometres south of the village and Cashel which is 24 kilometres east of the village.

Sports
Cappawhite is home to Cappawhite GAA who were Tipperary Senior Hurling Championship winners in 1987 and Tipperary U21 Champions in 1999.

External links
Cappawhite Village Website

References

Towns and villages in County Tipperary